"Can't Let You Go" is a song by American hip-hop artist Fabolous. It was released on February 23, 2003 as the second single from his second studio album Street Dreams. It is a hip hop and R&B song that features Mike Shorey and Lil' Mo and was produced by Just Blaze.

Background
When Lil' Mo was going to record the first single to her debut album titled "Superwoman Pt. II", she asked DJ Clue for Fabolous to do the track with her after hearing him on one of Clue's mixtapes. She had previously worked with Jay-Z and Ja Rule, but wanted Fabolous on the track, despite only hearing him on a mixtape.

Music video
The music video was filmed in Los Angeles, California on February 21 and 22, 2003, after the music video for Lil' Mo's "4Ever" was filmed in Brooklyn, New York the previous month.

Directed by Erik White, the music video starts with Fabolous creeping back into bed in the morning with one twin sister, after spending the night with the other twin. It continues showing him with the two women in similar places, expressing his admiration for both, even buying two copies of a necklace for each twin. Mike Shorey and Lil' Mo sing the chorus after each dating scene. At a restaurant, the two women confront each other, then confront Fabolous and begin to argue. The video then transitions to a song titled "Damn", where Fabolous is rapping in front of lighted letters that read "damn" while women dance behind him.

Track listing
 "Can't Let You Go" (album version)
 "Can't Let You Go" (main remix original version)
 "Young'n" (album version)
 "Can't Deny It" (album version)

Personnel
 Aladdin – A&R
 Tom Coyne – mastering
 Rick Rock – producer
 Jason Stasium – engineer
 Paul Gregory – engineer
 Just Blaze – producer
 Fabolous – main performer
 E Bass – producer
 Nick Howard – engineer
 DJ Clue? – executive producer, A&R
 Skane – executive producer

Charts

Weekly charts

Year-end charts

Certifications

Release history

References

External links
Music video on YouTube

2003 singles
Fabolous songs
Lil' Mo songs
Songs written by Lil' Mo
Song recordings produced by Just Blaze
Music videos directed by Erik White
Hip hop soul songs